Châu Thành is a rural district of Bến Tre province in the Mekong Delta of Vietnam.  the district had a population of 167,472. The district covers an area of 229 km². The district capital lies at Châu Thành.

The district lies to the north of Bến Tre Province, the Tiên River, the towns of Bến Tre and Mỹ Tho and the districts of Châu Thành and Cai Lậy in Tiền Giang province. To the south is the Hàm Luông River and the Chợ Lách and Mỏ Cày districts.

Administrative divisions
The district is divided into one township, Châu Thành (capital), and the following communes:

Tân Phú
Tiên Long
Qưới Thành
Tiên Thủy
Phú Đức

Thành Triệu
Tường Đa
An Hiệp
Sơn Hòa
Tam Phước
An Khánh
Tân Thạch
Phú An Hòa
Qưới Sơn
An Phước
Giao Long
Giao Hòa
An Hóa
Phước Thạnh
Hữu Đinh

References

Districts of Bến Tre province